The events of 1973 in anime.

Releases

Births

July
 July 26: Hiromasa Yonebayashi, Japanese animator and director (Studio Ghibli).

Deaths

May
 May 26: Ōten Shimokawa Japanese artist anime pioneers dies at age 81.

See also
1973 in animation

External links 
Japanese animated works of the year, listed in the IMDb

Anime
Anime
Years in anime